Trude is a Germanic Old Norse feminine given name meaning "strength". The name is now most commonly found in Germany and German-speaking countries and in Norway. It is sometimes used as a diminutive of the given names Gertrude and Gertrud.

Notable people named Trude 
Trude Beiser (born 1927), Austrian alpine ski racer 
Trude Berliner (1903–1977), German actress
Trude Dothan (1922–2016), Israeli archaeologist
Trude Dybendahl (born 1966), Norwegian cross-country skier 
Trude Eick (born 1969), Norwegian musician and composer
Trude Eipperle (1908–1997), German operatic soprano
Trude Feldman (born 1924), American reporter, columnist and correspondent
Trude Fleischmann (1895–1990), Austrian-American photographer
Trude Gimle (born 1974), Norwegian alpine skier
Trude Guermonprez (1910–1976), German-American textile artist and designer 
Trude Gundersen (born 1977), Norwegian taekwondo practitioner
Trude Haefelin (1914–2008), German actress
Trude Harstad (born 1974), Norwegian biathlete
Trude Herr (1927–1991), German actress, singer and theatre owner
Trude Hestengen (born 1983), Norwegian dressage rider
Trude Hesterberg (1892–1967), German actress
Trude Klecker (born 1926), Austrian alpine skier
Gertrude Kleinová (aka Trude Kleinová; 1918–1976), Czech table tennis player 
Gertrude Kolar (aka Trude Kolar; 1926–2014), Austrian artistic gymnast
Trude Brænne Larssen (born 1967), Norwegian novelist
Trude Lash, (1908–2004), German political activist and associate of Eleanor Roosevelt
Trude Lehmann (1892–1987), German actress
Gertrude Liebhart (aka Trude Liebhart; born 1928), Austrian sprint canoer
Trude Malcorps (born 1921), Dutch swimmer
Trude Marlen (1912–2005), Austrian actress
Trude Marstein (born 1973), Norwegian author
Trude Mohr (1902–1989) German Nazi Party League of German Girls leader
Trude Möhwaldová (born 1915), Czech alpine skier 
Trude von Molo (1906–1989), Austrian actress
Trude Mostue (born 1968), Norwegian veterinary surgeon and television personality
Trude Raad (born 1990), Norwegian track and field athlete
Trude Richter (1899–1989), German writer, literary scholar and political activist
Trude Rittmann (1908–2005), German-American composer 
Trude Sojka (1909–2007), Czech–Ecuadorian painter and sculptor
Trude Stendal (born 1963), Norwegian footballer
Trude Trefall (aka Manjari; born 1978), Norwegian singer
Trude Unruh (born 1925), German politician
Trude Weiss-Rosmarin (1908–1989), German-American writer, editor, scholar and feminist activist
Trude Wollschläger (1912–1975), German swimmer

Fictional characters 
 Trude, a character in the Australian television situation comedy Kath & Kim

References 

German feminine given names
Norwegian feminine given names
Swedish feminine given names
Scandinavian feminine given names
Feminine given names